Boojum is a chain of Mexican fast-food restaurants in Ireland. Founded in 2007 by John and Karen Blisard, they operate 17 outlets throughout the Republic of Ireland and Northern Ireland, as well as a "Turbo Boojum" outlet in Dublin.

Foundation 
Boojum was founded in 2007 by John Blisard and his wife Karen, who met in Philadelphia. The chain was bought in 2015 and is now owned by former Ulster Rugby player Andy Maxwell and his brother David, a 2018 EY Entrepreneur of the Year finalist.

Products 
As well as burritos, tacos, fajitas and burrito bowls, Boojum also produces home barbecue kits, and rice-scented candles.

In 2021, Boojum's managing director David Maxwell criticised supermarket chain Morrisons for apparently imitating Boojum's branding on their Mexican ready meal range. In 2017, Boojum's burrito was the second most commonly ordered item of food on Deliveroo in the world. In 2018, their burrito was the fourth most commonly ordered item of food on Deliveroo in the world.

Advertising 
In 2019, an advertisement for Boojum featuring a depiction of Jesus was criticised by a spokesperson from the Presbyterian Church in Ireland, as well as DUP councillor Mark Baxter.

In 2022, the chain apologised after a photo of two tip jars depicting Johnny Depp and Amber Heard emerged on social media.

References 

Fast-food chains of Ireland
Restaurants in the Republic of Ireland
Restaurant chains in Ireland
Irish companies established in 2007
Retail companies of the Republic of Ireland
Restaurants established in 2007